John Laidlaw (born 5 July 1936) is an English former footballer who played in the Football League as a full-back for Colchester United.

Career
Laidlaw, born in Aldershot, began his playing career in Scotland with Easthouses Lily before being signed by Colchester United in the Football League in September 1959. He made his debut for the club on 5 September in a 4–2 Third Division defeat to Southampton. Laidlaw scored once in 41 league appearances for the U's, scoring in the reverse fixture with Southampton at Layer Road, a game which resulted in a 1–1 draw. He played his final game for Colchester on 22 August 1960 when he suffered a knee cartilage injury during a 1–1 home draw with Grimsby Town. Laidlaw never played professionally again. After his release from Colchester, he played for Clacton Town.

References

1936 births
Living people
Sportspeople from Aldershot
Footballers from Hampshire
English footballers
Association football fullbacks
Easthouses Lily Miners Welfare F.C. players
Colchester United F.C. players
F.C. Clacton players
English Football League players